Elisabeth Nagele (12 June 1933 – 22 June 1993) was a Swiss luger who competed in the early 1960s. She won the gold medal in the women's singles at the 1961 FIL World Luge Championships in Girenbad, Switzerland. Nagele also finished 12th in the women's singles event at the 1964 Winter Olympics in Innsbruck. She later served as a delegate to the International Luge Federation (FIL) in the late 1980s.

References 

Hickok sports information on World champions in luge and skeleton.
RevueOlympique article on the FIL featuring Nagele in January-February 1987. p. 55 
Skeleton information on Pedersen and Stahli with history of luge in right column featuring Nagele 
SportQuick.com information on World champions in luge 

Lugers at the 1964 Winter Olympics
Swiss female lugers
Olympic lugers of Switzerland
1933 births
1993 deaths